Uyts is a village in the Sisian Municipality of the Syunik Province in Armenia. Uyts lies roughly 3.5 kilometers away from the nearby city of Sisian.

Demographics 
The Statistical Committee of Armenia reported its population was 586 in 2010, compared to 453 at the 2001 census. Many residents are farmers or sheepherders, with agriculture playing an important role in village life. Uyts has a small school, with roughly 70 students enrolled at any given time. Many teachers commute from neighboring Sisian to work in the village.

Gallery

References 

Populated places in Syunik Province